Amauropsis sphaeroides is a species of predatory sea snail, a marine gastropod mollusk in the family Naticidae, the moon snails.

Description
The maximum recorded shell length is 15 mm.

Habitat
Minimum recorded depth is 3185 m. Maximum recorded depth is 4166 m.

References

Naticidae
Gastropods described in 1877
Taxa named by John Gwyn Jeffreys